Mukdahan Province Stadium is a multi-purpose stadium in Mukdahan province , Thailand.  It is currently used mostly for football matches and is the home stadium of Mukdahan F.C.

Multi-purpose stadiums in Thailand
Buildings and structures in Mukdahan province
Sport in Mukdahan province